The Eighth was a federal holiday in the United States from 1828 until 1861 commemorating the U.S. victory in the Battle of New Orleans on January 8, 1815.

Origins
The Eighth was celebrated widely across the Southern United States after the War of 1812. January 8 became an official federal holiday in 1828, following Andrew Jackson's election as president and continued as such from that time until the start of the Civil War. The holiday remains largely forgotten by the American public.

According to The Bryan (Ohio) Times article from January 4, 2005, the Battle of New Orleans was a "major turning point" in American history, but many people who live in New Orleans did not even know that the battle happened in their city. As it was the final war waged against the United Kingdom of Great Britain and Ireland, some consider it to be America's second independence. Historians recall the celebrations were larger than Christmas and were only surpassed by The Fourth.

See also
 Federal holidays in the United States
 Public holidays in the United States

References

External links

 

1828 establishments in the United States
Annual events in the United States
Battle of New Orleans
History of Louisiana
19th century in the United States
Holidays related to the War of 1812
January 1828 events
January observances
Louisiana state holidays
Public holidays in the United States
Recurring events established in 1828

Victory days